Hidden Shoal is an independent record label and music publisher based in Perth, Western Australia.

Launched in 2006 by Cameron Merton, Stuart Medley and Malcolm Riddoch, Hidden Shoal is home to more than 40 international artists and an eclectic catalogue of music from across indie, experimental, post-rock, electronic and ambient music. Hidden Shoal's publishing arm licenses music for use in film, TV, games, web, compilations and other media.

Artists (Past and Present)

 Apricot Rail
 Antonymes
 Beautiful Lunar Landscape
 Boxharp
 Brother Earth
 Bury the Sound
 The Caribbean
 [The] Caseworker
 Cheekbone
 Chloe March
 Chris Mason
 Christopher Sky
 City of Satellites
 Colour Kane
 CSR
 Dilatazione
 Down Review
 DrAlienSmith
 Elisa Luu
 Enargeia
 Fall Electric
 Gilded
 Glanko
 Glassacre
 Half Film
 HC-B
 The Hero Cycle
 Hotels
 Involved
 Iretsu
 Jumpel
 Kramies
 Kryshe
 Les Limbes
 Liam Singer
 Low Budget Invaders
 Makee
 Markus Mehr
 Monocle
 Moongoat
 Motor Eye
 Mukaizake
 My Majestic Star
 perth
 The Retail Sectors
 Rich Bennett
 RL/VL
 Salli Lunn
 Sankt Otten
 Scott Solter
 Sleeping Me
 The Slow Beings
 Slow Dancing Society
 Stray Ghost
 Tangled Star
 Tarcutta
 Toby Richardson
 Todd Tobias
 Umpire
 Wayne Hariss
 Wes Willenbring
 Willem Gator
 Wizards of Time

See also
 List of record labels

External links
Official website

Australian independent record labels
Music publishing companies of Australia
Record labels established in 2006
Experimental music record labels
Ambient music record labels
Companies based in Perth, Western Australia